The House of Atreus Act II, released in 2000, is the tenth studio album by the American heavy metal band Virgin Steele. It was released as a double CD album. This album is the second and final part of a metal opera inspired by the Oresteia, a trilogy of Greek tragedies written by Aeschylus which concerns the end of the curse on the House of Atreus. The music was intended to be the soundtrack for theatrical shows, with actors impersonating the characters of the tragedy. The metal opera was actually performed under the name "Klytaimnestra - The House Of Atreus" in European theatres from 1999 to 2001, with the production of the Memmingen Opera House company and Landestheater Production.

In 2019, Metal Hammer ranked it as the 12th best power metal album of all time.

Track listing
All songs by David DeFeis except tracks 3, 8, 10, 23 by DeFeis / Edward Pursino.

CD 1

CD 2

Personnel

Band members
David DeFeis - all vocals, keyboards, orchestration, effects, producer
Edward Pursino - acoustic and electric guitars, bass
Frank Gilchriest - drums

Production
Steve Young - engineer, mastering
Ed Warrin - engineer

References

2000 albums
Virgin Steele albums
Rock operas
Noise Records albums
Works based on The Libation Bearers
Works based on The Eumenides